Peltura is a genus of trilobites from the Upper Cambrian. The type specimen of Peltura scarabaeoides, the type species of the genus, was discovered in the Alum Shale Formation of Sweden and described by the Swedish naturalist Göran Wahlenberg in 1818. Species of this genus have now been found throughout the Scandinavian and Baltic regions.

References

Olenina
Ptychopariida genera
Fossil taxa described in 1818
Taxa named by Henri Milne-Edwards